Fred Mayer is the name of:

 Fred Shaw Mayer (1899–1989), Australian ornithologist
 Frederick Mayer (1921–2006), German educational scientist
 Frederick Mayer (spy) (1921–2016), American spy during World War II
 Fred Mayer (photographer) (born 1933), Swiss photographer

See also
Fred L. Myers, founder of Myers's Rum
Fred Meyer (disambiguation)
Mayer (disambiguation)